Manuela Gretkowska (6 October 1964) is a Polish writer, screenwriter, feminist and politician. She is the foundress of the Feminist Initiative.

Biography

Manuela Gretkowska was born in Łódź and studied philosophy at Jagiellonian University in Kraków. In 1988, she left Poland to live in Paris, where she studied anthropology at the École des hautes études en sciences sociales.  In the early 1990s, she returned to her country, where she was deputy editor-in-chief and then literary director at Elle.  She wrote columns for Elle, Cosmopolitan, Wprost, Polityka, Machina, and Cogito.

Gretkowska's literary debut was the novel We Are Immigrants Here (My zdies' emigranty) (1991), in which she described the experiences of the young generation leaving Poland.  The work of the young artist was favorably reviewed by Czesław Miłosz, whose preface appeared in the first edition.  Gretkowska's next three books described the life of a modern artistic-intellectual bohemian living in France: Paris Tarot (1993), Metaphysical Cabaret (1994), and Textbook for people. Skull: The First and Last Volume (1996) connects gnosis, kabbala, the character of Mary Magdalene and the skull motif in global culture.  In this period, the writer earned the title of "scandalist" and "postmodernist."  Manuela Gretkowski's prose eschewed grandiose language, more similar to the ease and austerity of the essay.  In 1996, Gretkowska wrote a screenplay for the Andrzej Żuławski film Szamanka (She-Shaman).

In 1997, Gretkowska moved to Sweden, where she published several collected stories in the book Namiętnik (The Passionate One) (1998), notes from her world travels in Światowidz (World-View) (1998), and her columns, under the collective title Silikon (Silicon) (2000).  She also co-wrote the screenplay for the first season of the TV series Miasteczko (Small Town) (2000).

Gretkowska's newest work is more personal, almost intimate prose.  Polka (Polish woman) (2001) was the writer's pregnancy journal, while Europejka (European Woman) (2004) presents a humorous view of a changing Poland through the eyes of Gretkowska the intellectual.  In 2003 the author, together with her partner Piotr Pietucha wrote Scenes from Extramarital Life. Three years later, Gretkowska wrote a column for the monthly magazine Success that was highly critical of the Kaczyński brothers (twins who at the time held the positions of Poland's President and Prime Minister).  The issue hit stands with this text cut out (literally) of every copy.

She lives in Ustanow (near Warsaw) with her daughter Pola and the writer and psychotherapist Piotr Pietucha.

Women's Party
In 2007, Gretkowska transformed the social movement "Poland is a Woman" into a new Political party - the Women's Party (Partia Kobiet), from which she ran a failed campaign in the Polish and European parliaments.  In October 2007, after the party's defeat in the parliamentary elections, she resigned the party's leadership but remains an "honorary leader".

Works

Books
 We Are Immigrants Here (1991)
 Paris Tarot (1993)
 Metaphysical Cabaret (1994)
 Textbook for People (1996)
 The Passionate One (1998)
 World-View (1998)
 Silicon (2000)
 Polish Woman (2001)
 Scenes from Extramarital Life (2003)
 European Woman (2004)
 Woman and Men (2007)
 Heaven's Day (2007)
 Citizen (2008)
 Love in Polish (Miłość po polsku) (2010)
 Trans (2011)
 Agent (2012)

Screenplays
 She-Shaman (1996)
 Egoists (1999)
 Small Town (TV series)

External links
 
 Polish bibliography 1988 - 2001
 at Cultura.PL

1964 births
Jagiellonian University alumni
Living people
Polish feminists
Writers from Łódź
21st-century Polish women politicians
Polish women writers